Henry William Burrows (1858–1941) 
was an English palaeontologist.
Burrows was a Fellow of the Geological Society.

Works

With George Frederick Harris The Eocene and Oligocene beds of the Paris basin. London :University college, E. Stanford,1891.pdf
Burrows, H. W. & Holland, R. 1897. The foraminifera of the Thanet Beds of Pegwell Bay. Proceedings of the Geologists' Association, 15, 19–52.

References
Obit. Quarterly Journal of the Geological Society 97

English geologists
1941 deaths
1858 births